Margaret ('Peg') Hewitt George (April 5, 1928 – July 2, 2021) was an American author and Democratic member of the Pennsylvania House of Representatives.

Early life and education
George was born in Chester, Pennsylvania to Charles H.S. Hewitt and Margaret Wright.  She graduated from Prospect Park High School and Ursinus College.

Political life 
George was the first woman and first Democrat on the local school board, being named as the director of the Pennsylvania Department of Education's Office of State and Federal Relations.

From 1977 until 1980, George served in the Pennsylvania House of Representatives as the first woman and only Democrat to have represented her legislative district (Bucks County, 143rd District).

Writing career 
George is the author or editor of several books including:
 2004:  - a fictional account of George's life in politics.
 2006  - A compilation of 42 stories told to George by women who lived through World War II.

Personal life 
George lived in Doylestown, Bucks County, Pennsylvania and has two sons, one daughter, and four granddaughters. She died on July 2, 2021, in Doylestown.

References

External links
Official website
Official blog

1928 births
2021 deaths
Democratic Party members of the Pennsylvania House of Representatives
School board members in Pennsylvania
Ursinus College alumni
Women state legislators in Pennsylvania
Writers from Pennsylvania
People from Chester, Pennsylvania
21st-century American women